Jane Kurshan Brown (born 1943) is an American literary scholar, currently the Joff Hanauer Distinguished Professor of Western Civilization Emerita (Germanics and Comparative Literature) at the University of Washington.

Publications
Select works:
 Goethe's cyclical narratives, Die Unterhaltungen deutscher Ausgewanderten and Wilhelm Meisters Wanderjahre, 1975 
 Goethe's Faust : the German tragedy, 1986
 Faust : theater of the world, 1992
 Ironie und Objektivität : Aufsätze zu Goethe, 1998
 The persistence of allegory : drama and neoclassicism from Shakespeare to Wagner, 2006
 Goethe's allegories of identity, 2014

References

1943 births
Living people
University of Washington faculty
University of Washington Department of German faculty
Professors of German in the United States
21st-century American historians
American women historians
21st-century American women writers